Kanchinath Jha "Kiran" (1906–1989) was an Indian Maithili-language writer. His poetry was representative of the new modernist spirit in Maithili literature after the Second World War. In addition to essays and articles, he wrote novels (like Chandigrahan) which feature realism and treat the problems of common people.

The Kiran Memorial Educational Welfare Society was established in his name.

References

Further reading 

20th-century Indian writers
Maithili writers
1906 births
1989 deaths